The 2017–18 Senior Women's One Day League was the 12th edition of the women's List A cricket competition in India. It took place in December 2017 in a round-robin format, with 27 teams divided into an Elite Group and a Plate Group. At the end of season the finalists from the Plate Group, Bengal and Goa, were promoted to the Elite Group, whilst Railways won the Elite Group Super League to claim their eleventh title.

Competition format
The 27 teams competing in the tournament were divided into the Elite Group and the Plate Group, with the 10 teams in the Elite Group further divided into Groups A and B and the 17 teams in the Plate Group into Groups A, B and C. The tournament operated on a round-robin format, with each team playing every other team in their group once. The top two sides from each Elite Group progressed to the Elite Group Super League, which was a further round-robin group, with the winner of the group being crowned Champions. The bottom side from each Elite Group was relegated to the Plate Group for the following season. Meanwhile, the top two from each Plate Group progressed to a knockout stage, with the two teams that reached the final being promoted for the following season, as well as playing off for the Plate Group title. Matches were played using a 50 over format.

The groups worked on a points system with positions with the groups being based on the total points. Points were awarded as follows:

Win: 4 points. 
Tie: 2 points. 
Loss: 0 points. 
No Result/Abandoned: 2 points.

If points in the final table are equal, teams are separated by most wins, then head-to-head record, then Net Run Rate.

Elite Group

Teams

Elite Group A 

The Elite Group A comprised Railways, Andhra, Hyderabad, Himachal Pradesh and Madhya Pradesh. Railways finished at the top of their table with four wins from four games while Andhra finished in second position.

Elite Group B 

The Elite Group B comprised Delhi, Mumbai, Baroda, Maharashtra and Uttar Pradesh. Delhi finished at the top of the table with three wins from four games whilst Mumbai finished in second position.

Elite Group Super League 

Railways emerged as champions of the 2017–18 Senior Women's One Day League. The Mithali Raj-led team won all their three matches in the Super League to finish at the top of the table and claim the title, whilst Delhi finished as runners-up.

Plate Group

Teams

Plate Group A

Plate Group B

Plate Group C

Plate Knockout Stage

Statistics

Most runs

Source: BCCI

Most wickets 

Source: BCCI

References 

2017-18
2017–18 Indian women's cricket
Domestic cricket competitions in 2017–18
December 2017 sports events in Asia